Sukiasyan is an Armenian surname. Notable people with the surname include:

 Khachatur Sukiasyan (born 1961), Armenian politician
 Varuzhan Sukiasyan (born 1956), Armenian football manager
 Yervand Sukiasyan (born 1967), Armenian football player

Armenian-language surnames